Operation MH-1 was a Macedonian mini-offensive and sweep operation designed to clear out the NLA rebels from the Skopska Crna Gora region all along the Macedonian border. The offensive started on March 28, 2001, and ended the next day.

Prelude

Two days before the start of Operation MH-1 the Macedonian security forces started Operation MH in the Tetovo region which cleared out the NLA from the city and the surrounding villages.

Battle

The Macedonian security forces started a two pronged attack near the Kosovo borderusing tanks, APC's and helicopter gunships and occupied most roads and villages along the Kosovo border installing police checkpoints.

During the Battle the Macedonian Army was embarrassed by the NLA, Macedonian infantry units were extremely reluctant to engage in an open battle with the rebels.

Although the Macedonian Army officially claimed victory, the NLA stated that they were only regrouping around Gračani for an upcoming Counter-Offensive.

Aftermath

After the end of operation MH-1 and the securing of the Kosovo border Macedonia launches Operation MH-2 to clear out the rebels in Kumanovo.

See also

 Operation MH
 Operation MH-2
 Operation Vaksince

References

2001 insurgency in Macedonia